Tapiolan Honka is a basketball club based in Espoo, Finland. Their men's team plays in Korisliiga and their women's team plays in Naisten Korisliiga, both on highest tiers of Finnish basketball.

History

It was founded as a sports club Tapion Honka in 1957. The basketball section separated in 1975 under the name of Tapiolan Honka. Nowadays the club has 700 licensed players and over 1200 total members in different age categories. From 1975 onwards, the men's first team was known as Espoon Honka. The team was dissolved in 2011 and a new team was founded under the original name Tapiolan Honka.

Honours

 Finnish Championships (5):
 1968, 1969, 1970, 1971, 1972

Notable players

  Seppo Kuusela
  Uolevi Manninen
  Anton Odabasi
  Kimmo Muurinen
  Annika Holopainen
  Lele Hardy
  Kiana Johnson
  Haiden Palmer

References

External links

 Tapiolan Honka official website
 Tapiolan Honka in Korisliiga
 Tapiolan Honka in Naisten Korisliiga

Basketball teams in Finland
Sport in Espoo
1957 establishments in Finland